Hatfield Rural District  was a rural district in Hertfordshire, England, from 1894 to 1974, covering an area in the south of the county.

Evolution
The district had its origins in the Hatfield Rural Sanitary District. This had been created under the Public Health Acts of 1872 and 1875, giving public health and local government responsibilities for rural areas to the existing boards of guardians of poor law unions. The Hatfield Rural Sanitary District covered the same area as the Hatfield Poor Law Union. Under the Local Government Act 1894, rural sanitary districts became rural districts from 28 December 1894. The link with the poor law union continued, with all the elected councillors of the rural district council being ex officio members of the Hatfield Board of Guardians. As there were no urban districts within the Hatfield Poor Law Union, the Hatfield Rural District Council and the Hatfield Board of Guardians were the same group of people.

The council was granted a coat of arms on 11 May 1945.

Parishes
Hatfield Rural District contained the following civil parishes.

Premises
In the early years, the Hatfield Rural District Council met at the board room in the Hatfield Union Workhouse, which stood on Wellfield Road (then called Union Lane). By 1933 the council had moved to purpose-built offices at 16 St Albans Road in Hatfield.

Abolition
Hatfield Rural District was abolished under the Local Government Act 1972, merging with Welwyn Rural District and the urban district of Welwyn Garden City to form the new district of Welwyn Hatfield. The council's former offices at 16 St Albans Road continued to be used by the new council for some years, before being converted to flats and renamed Tudor House around 2011.

References

Rural districts of England
Districts of England created by the Local Government Act 1894
Districts of England abolished by the Local Government Act 1972
Local government in Hertfordshire